The 1916–17 Tennessee Volunteers basketball team represents the University of Tennessee during the 1916–17 college men's basketball season. The head coach was John R. Bender coaching the Volunteers in his first season. The Volunteers team captain was Joseph Jacobs.

Schedule

|-

References

Tennessee Volunteers basketball seasons
Tennessee
Tennessee Volunteers
Tennessee Volunteers